Forest of Dean District Council is the local authority for the Forest of Dean in Gloucestershire, England. The council is elected every four years. Since the last boundary changes in 2019, 38 councillors are elected from 21 wards.

Political control
Since the first elections to the council in 1973 political control of the council has been held by the following parties:

Leadership
The leaders of the council since 2007 have been:

Council elections
1973 Forest of Dean District Council election
1976 Forest of Dean District Council election
1979 Forest of Dean District Council election
1983 Forest of Dean District Council election (New ward boundaries)
1987 Forest of Dean District Council election
1991 Forest of Dean District Council election
1995 Forest of Dean District Council election
1999 Forest of Dean District Council election (Some new ward boundaries)
2003 Forest of Dean District Council election (New ward boundaries reduced the number of seats by 3)
2007 Forest of Dean District Council election
2011 Forest of Dean District Council election
2015 Forest of Dean District Council election
2019 Forest of Dean District Council election (New ward boundaries reduced number of seats from 48 to 38)

By-election results

1995-1999

1999-2003

2003-2007

2007-2011

2011-2015

2015-present

References

By-election results

External links
Forest of Dean District Council

 
Council elections in Gloucestershire
Forest of Dean
District council elections in England